Yasmin is a 2004 drama film directed by Kenneth Glenaan, written by Simon Beaufoy and starring Archie Panjabi and Renu Setna. It is set amongst a British Pakistani community in parts of Keighley (in West Yorkshire, England) before and after the events of the September 11 attacks.

Premise
Yasmin is a young Muslim woman living in Britain. After Yasmin's husband is arrested on suspected terror charges following the September 11th attacks, she campaigns for his release from a holding center.

Cast
Archie Panjabi
Renu Setna
Steve Jackson
Syed Ahmed
Shahid Ahmed
Badi Uzzaman
Amar Hussain
Joanna Booth
Emma Ashton
Rae Kelly
Amir Farshad Ebrahimi

See also
List of cultural references to the September 11 attacks

References

External links
 
New Jersey Independent South Asian Cinefest brings movies from around the globe to Edison

2004 films
Films based on the September 11 attacks
British drama films
British Pakistani films
2000s English-language films
Films set in Yorkshire
2004 drama films
Films with screenplays by Simon Beaufoy
German drama films
English-language German films
2000s Punjabi-language films
2000s British films
2000s German films